Matthias Reutimann (born 15 November 1994) is a Swiss cyclist, who currently rides for UCI Continental team . He was selected to compete in the 2021 Tour de Romandie with the Swiss national team.

Major results
2016
 1st Coppa d'Inverno
2017
 1st Mountains classification, International Tour of Rhodes
2018
 1st  Hill-climb, National Road Championships
 9th Memorial Philippe Van Coningsloo
2019
 2nd Hill-climb, National Road Championships
2020
 6th Road race, National Road Championships

References

External links

1994 births
Living people
Swiss male cyclists
People from Winterthur
Sportspeople from the canton of Zürich